Sunniva Austigard Petersen (born 1 October 2003) is a Norwegian footballer who plays as a forward for Viking FK in the Norwegian Second Division.

Career

In 2021, Petersen signed for Viking FK. During the 2022 season, she scored four goals during a 13-0 win over Stord.

Personal life

Petersen has two sisters, Frida and Eir, who are both powerlifters for Norwegian club Sandnes AK.

Honours
Viking FK
Winner
 Norwegian Second Division Group 4: 2021
Runner-up
 Norwegian Second Division Group 4: 2022

References

Norwegian footballers
2003 births
Living people